Provincial Road 272 (PR 272) is a provincial road in the Canadian province of Manitoba.  It runs from Highway 20 near Camperville to the village of Duck Bay.

272